Siglap FC is an association football club based in Siglap , Singapore. The club competes in  Singapore Football League. In 2016, the club was the finalist in Singapore FA Cup, losing 3–1 to  Home United Prime League.

References
 Home United FC beats Siglap FC 3-1 in Singapore Pools FA Cup final
 
 http://www.fas.org.sg/minor_team/siglap-fc/

Football clubs in Singapore